January Isaac-Bodlovic (born February 18, 1976) is a Filipino actress.

Career
Isaac, previously credited as Sandra Gomez, was one of the talents introduced by ABS-CBN's Talent Center, now Star Magic, in 1998.

She played the titular character of Surf's "Lumen—Wais na Misis" series of advertisements, which ran from 1998 to 2015.

Isaac previously fronted the short-lived acoustic band January Summer.

Personal life
Isaac is married to Wade Bodlovic, together they have two children Hunter and Harley.

Isaac is a practical shooter and a black belt in taekwondo and aikido.

Filmography

Television

Film

References

External links

1976 births
Living people
Star Magic
De La Salle–College of Saint Benilde alumni